The 2007 Tropicana International Darts League was the fifth and final edition of the International Darts League. It was held at the Triavium in Nijmegen, Netherlands from 4–12 May 2007. The tournament was sponsored by Tropicana — a Dutch-based soft drink manufacturer. Raymond van Barneveld entered the tournament as three-times and defending champion. As in 2006, it was a cross-code event featuring players from both the World Darts Federation and the Professional Darts Corporation.

Darts history was made when the tournament became the first televised event to witness two nine dart finishes. On May 8, Phil Taylor hit his fourth perfect game on television against Raymond van Barneveld and the following night Tony O'Shea matched the effort against Adrian Lewis.

Despite the presence of current BDO and PDC World Champions and four other former world champions in the field, none progressed beyond the quarter-finals. 36 year old Gary Anderson won his first major title with a 13–9 victory over fellow BDO/WDF player Mark Webster.

Prize fund
The total prize fund is €135,000 (plus €26,000 for a nine-dart finish)

Winner €30,000
Runner-up €15,000
Semi-finalists €7,500
Quarter-finalists €4,500
2nd Group stage losers €3,000
1st Group stage losers €2,000
Preliminary round losers €1,000
Nine dart finish An Opel Tigra TwinTop valued at €26,000 – achieved by Phil Taylor on May 8 v Raymond van Barneveld. The sponsors presented Tony O'Shea with the same brand of car later in the tournament for his nine-darter on May 9, although originally there was only one bonus prize on offer.
Highest checkout €1,000 currently shared by Phil Taylor 170 & Adrian Lewis

2007 controversy
The staging of the 2007 IDL was filled with controversy. There were several format changes, disagreements and even court cases surrounding the event.

In 2006 the BDO secured an agreement for 28 of their players to participate in the event until 2010. However, as the popularity of the PDC circuit grew in the Netherlands, the organisers decided to renege on the deal and invite only 12 BDO players. The remaining 20 players would qualify from the PDC including their top 12 ranked players plus four wildcards and four from a PDC/PDPA qualifying event.

This led to a threat from the BDO to take court action against the organisers who wanted their agreement upholding. A compromise was reached and the organisers introduced a preliminary round. The original 16 BDO/WDF players who believed they had missed out were to be joined by a further four automatic qualifiers from the PDC Order of Merit and a further four players from an already confirmed qualifying event in April. This expanded the field from 32 to 56 players.

However the sponsors of the four wildcard players (Michael van Gerwen, Mervyn King, Jelle Klaasen and Vincent van der Voort) were upset that their players had been relegated to the preliminary round when they felt they had an agreement to be automatically into the televised stages. The BDO also felt that all 28 of their players should not have to face a preliminary round. The dispute was resolved on April 25 when a Dutch court rejected the claims of the four wildcard players. Three of the players managed to qualify from the preliminary round with only van der Voort missing out.

Results

Preliminary round
Played Friday 4 May 2007

Group One – Winner: Mervyn King
Matt Clark 5–4 Albertino Essers
Mervyn King 5–1 Steve Farmer
Steve Farmer 5–4 Albertino Essers
Mervyn King 5–3 Matt Clark
Matt Clark 5–0 Steve Farmer
Mervyn King 5–1 Albertino Essers

Group Two – Winner: Gary Robson
Gary Robson 5–0 Alan Tabern
Edwin Max 5–2 Kevin Painter
Gary Robson 5–1 Edwin Max
Kevin Painter 5–2 Alan Tabern
Alan Tabern 5–3 Edwin Max
Kevin Painter 5–3 Gary Robson

Group Three – Winner: Michael van Gerwen
Brian Sorensen 5–0 Kevin McDine
Michael van Gerwen 5–1 Steve West
Steve West 5–4 Brian Sorensen
Michael van Gerwen 5–3 Kevin McDine
Michael van Gerwen 5–4 Brian Sorensen
Kevin McDine 5–3 Steve West

Group Four – Winner: Ross Montgomery
Ross Montgomery 5–4 Chris Mason
Dirk Hespeels 5–2 Vincent van der Voort
Ross Montgomery 5–4 Dirk Hespeels
Vincent van der Voort 5–3 Chris Mason
Dirk Hespeels 5–0 Chris Mason
Ross Montgomery 5–2 Vincent van der Voort

Group Five – Winner: Barrie Bates
Wayne Jones 5–2 Shane Tichowitsch
Barrie Bates 5–1 Phill Nixon
Phill Nixon 5–4 Shane Tichowitsch
Barrie Bates 5–1 Wayne Jones
Barrie Bates 5–3 Shane Tichowitsch
Phill Nixon 5–4 Wayne Jones

Group Six – Winner: Mark Dudbridge
Mark Dudbridge 5–4 Goran Klemme
Andy Jenkins 5–1 Andy Murray
Andy Jenkins 5–4 Mark Dudbridge
Goran Klemme 5–1 Andy Murray
Goran Klemme 5–4 Andy Jenkins
Mark Dudbridge 5–0 Andy Murray

Group Seven – Winner: Jelle Klaasen
Robbie Green 5–2 Robert Hughes
Jelle Klaasen 5–1 Mark Barilli
Mark Barilli 5–0 Robert Hughes
Jelle Klaasen 5–2 Robbie Green
Jelle Klaasen 5–1 Robert Hughes
Robbie Green 5–2 Mark Barilli

Group Eight – Winner: Ronnie Baxter
Ron Meulenkamp 5–3 Richie Burnett
Ronnie Baxter 5–1 Paul Hogan
Ron Meulenkamp 5–2 Paul Hogan
Richie Burnett 5–4 Ronnie Baxter
Ronnie Baxter 5–2 Ron Meulenkamp
Richie Burnett 5–1 Paul Hogan

First round
Played Saturday 5 May to Monday 7 May

Second round
Played Tuesday 8 May to Thursday 10 May

Knockout stages

2007 format
The field was scheduled to contain 56 players with 12 automatically from each organisation going into the group stages. Some players from the BDO withdrew citing the uncertainty over the staging of the event as their reason.

A preliminary round will now consist of:
 The BDO/WDF players ranked 13 to 28 at the cut-off date (Mario Robbe, Scott Waites, Gary Robson, Brian Sørensen, Albertino Essers, Ross Montgomery, Ron Meulenkamp, Shane Tichowitsch, Robert Hughes, Göran Klemme, Steve West, Mark Barilli, Phill Nixon, Steve Farmer, Paul Hogan, Edwin Max) Dirk Hespeels and Andy Murray were added to the field to replace the withdrawn players
 The PDC players ranked 13 to 16 at the cut-off date (Ronnie Baxter, Andy Jenkins, Barrie Bates, Kevin Painter)
 Eight qualifiers from a PDPA qualifying tournament at Villa Park, Birmingham on April 21 (Chris Mason, Wayne Jones, Richie Burnett, Alan Tabern, Mark Dudbridge, Matt Clark, Kevin McDine and Robbie Green)
 Wildcards  Michael van Gerwen,  Jelle Klaasen,  Mervyn King and  Vincent van der Voort.
Eight players from the preliminary round will go through to join the 24 automatic qualifiers in the group stages.

References

International Darts League
International Darts League
2007 in Dutch sport